Living wall may refer to:

 Living Wall, a Croatian political party
 Living wall, alternative name for a green wall, a wall on which vegetation is grown
 Living Walls, an annual conference on street art
 Living wall (Dungeons & Dragons), a fictional monster from Dungeons & Dragons